The Pomeroy and Newark Railroad was a predecessor of the Pennsylvania Railroad in the U.S. states of Delaware and Pennsylvania. It connected Pomeroy, Pennsylvania to Newark, Delaware, and has mostly been abandoned.

History

The Pomeroy and Newark Railroad was the final step in a series of consolidations and a foreclosure. The earliest predecessors were the Delaware and Pennsylvania Railroad, incorporated February 1857 in Delaware, and the Pennsylvania and Delaware Railroad, incorporated August 1868 in Pennsylvania as the Doe Run and White Clay Creek Railroad, and renamed August 1870. The two companies completed a line from Pomeroy, on the Pennsylvania Railroad's Main Line, south to Newark and southeast to Delaware City on the Delaware Bay, in about 1873, and merged in May of that year to form the Pennsylvania and Delaware Railway. This company's property was sold at foreclosure in August 1879 to two new companies, the Pomeroy and State Line Railroad (incorporated February 1880 in Pennsylvania) and the Newark and Delaware City Railroad (incorporated April 1880 in Delaware). After the former sold the line southeast of Newark to the Philadelphia, Wilmington and Baltimore Railroad (PW&B), which it crossed at Newark, in 1881, those two companies merged in December as the Pomeroy and Newark Railroad. It became part of the Pennsylvania Railroad system, and in December 1917 the line was sold to the Philadelphia, Baltimore and Washington Railroad, Pennsylvania subsidiary and successor to the PW&B.

The last passenger trains ran over the line in September 1928, and abandonment for freight began in 1936. By the mid-1940s, it existed only at Newark and north of Chatham. These segments would remain to the end of Penn Central Transportation in 1976, except for a 1960s truncation from Chatham to Doe Run, but Conrail only acquired the short stub at Newark. Operation of the short piece at Newark, by then owned by Amtrak, went to the Norfolk Southern Railway in the 1999 breakup of Conrail.

Parts of the line have been re-purposed as trail. From the mainline in Newark to Hopkins Road in White Clay Creek State Park, the right-of-way is used for the Pomeroy and Newark rail trail, sometimes just called the Pomeroy Trail. After crossing into Pennsylvania, part of the right-of-way is used for parts of the Charlie Bailey and Penndel Trails in White Clay Creek Preserve. In Landenberg, PA parts of the right of way are use for parts of the Mill Race Trail and the Landeberg Junction Trail.

Ownership of the line between Newark and Delaware City also went to the Norfolk Southern. The line is still used as far as the oil refinery west of Delaware City, and the section of roadbed which once extended past the refinery to the waterfront is Delaware City was abandoned. It is now refinery property.

References

Transportation in Chester County, Pennsylvania
Defunct Delaware railroads
Defunct Pennsylvania railroads
Transportation in New Castle County, Delaware
Predecessors of the Pennsylvania Railroad
Railway companies established in 1881
Railway companies disestablished in 1917
Rail trails in Delaware
American companies established in 1881
1881 establishments in Delaware
1881 establishments in Pennsylvania
1917 disestablishments in Delaware
1917 disestablishments in Pennsylvania
Closed railway lines in the United States